Richard Krajicek was the defending champion, but he withdrew prior to his quarterfinal match this year.

Patrick Rafter won the tournament, beating Martin Damm in the final, 7–6(7–2), 6–2.

Seeds

Draw

Finals

Top half

Bottom half

References

 Main Draw

Rosmalen Grass Court Championships
1998 ATP Tour